Waunakee is a village in Dane County, Wisconsin, United States. The population was 14,879 at the 2020 census. It is part of the Madison Metropolitan Statistical Area. Waunakee bills itself as "The Only Waunakee in the World".

History

When the Chicago and Northwestern Railroad wanted to expand its line from Madison to Saint Paul, a door was opened for development of a town. The original location of the village was intended to be at Packham's Mill, about where Mill Road crosses the railroad track today two miles southeast of today's downtown Waunakee. However, two local settlers, Louis Baker and George Fish, platted a village on their land two miles further northwest along the railroad. Railroad officials agreed to moving a train depot to the new community in exchange for $1,500 and two miles of right of way. The village was founded in 1871 and formally incorporated in 1893. Baker and Fish did not want to take credit for naming the community, so they asked Simeon Mills and Mr. Hill of Madison to come up with a list. The name "Waunakee" has a Native American origin meaning "fair and pleasant valley."

Robert F. Kennedy visited the village to campaign for his brother John for president in February 1960.

Former First Lady Barbara Bush visited the village to campaign for her son George for president in October 2000.

The landmark Waunakee Railroad Depot located in the central part of town is listed on the National Register of Historic Places. It now houses the Waunakee Area Chamber of Commerce offices.

Geography

Waunakee is located at  (43.187253, −89.452244).

The village is bordered on the south and east by the town of Westport, the north by the town of Vienna, the northwest by the town of Dane, and to the west by the town of Springfield.

Six Mile Creek, the main waterway through the community, runs west to east before making a southerly turn through the village on its way to Lake Mendota.

Demographics

2010 census
As of the census of 2010, there were 12,097 people, 4,344 households, and 3,316 families living in the village. The racial makeup of the village was 95.8% White, 1.0% African American, 0.2% Native American, 1.2% Asian, 0.5% from other races, and 1.3% from two or more races. Hispanic or Latino people of any race were 2.2% of the population.

There were 4,344 households, of which 45.3% had children under the age of 18 living with them, 64.3% were married couples living together, 8.8% had a female householder with no husband present, 3.3% had a male householder with no wife present, and 23.7% were non-families. 19.5% of all households were made up of individuals, and 8.4% had someone living alone who was 65 years of age or older. The average household size was 2.76 and the average family size was 3.20.

The median age in the village was 37.9 years. 31.6% of residents were under the age of 18; 5.3% were between the ages of 18 and 24; 25.8% were from 25 to 44; 27.5% were from 45 to 64; and 9.9% were 65 years of age or older. The gender makeup of the village was 48.8% male and 51.2% female.

2000 census
As of the census of 2000, there were 8,995 people, 3,203 households, and 2,379 families living in the village. The population density was 1,509.9 people per square mile (582.7/km2). There were 3,295 housing units at an average density of 553.1 per square mile (213.5/km2). The racial makeup of the village was 98.07% White, 0.36% African American, 0.08% Native American, 0.51% Asian, 0.01% Pacific Islander, 0.24% from other races, and 0.73% from two or more races. Hispanic or Latino people of any race were 0.96% of the population.

There were 3,203 households, out of which 46.3% had children under the age of 18 living with them, 63.3% were married couples living together, 8.5% had a female householder with no husband present, and 25.7% were non-families. 20.2% of all households were made up of individuals, and 8.9% had someone living alone who was 65 years of age or older. The average household size was 2.76 and the average family size was 3.23.

In the village, the population was spread out, with 32.1% under the age of 18, 6.3% from 18 to 24, 33.4% from 25 to 44, 18.6% from 45 to 64, and 9.5% who were 65 years of age or older. The median age was 35 years. For every 100 females, there were 94.8 males. For every 100 females age 18 and over, there were 90.2 males.

The median income for a household in the village was $59,225, and the median income for a family was $67,894. Males had a median income of $45,053 versus $30,163 for females. The per capita income for the village was $25,952. About 0.4% of families and 1.7% of the population were below the poverty line, including 0.4% of those under age 18 and 2.0% of those age 65 or over.

Government

Waunakee is governed by a board consisting of a president and six trustees. The president and trustees are elected to two-year terms during spring elections. The Village President of Waunakee since April 2015 is Chris Zellner. The current village trustees are Nila Frye (since 2020), Gary Herzberg (2001–2018; since 2019), Sam Kaufmann (since 2021), Erin Moran (since 2018),  Phil Willems (since 2007), and Joe Zitzelsberger (2018–2020; since 2022).

The village is represented in the Wisconsin State Assembly by Dianne Hesselbein (D-Middleton) and in the State Senate by Jon Erpenbach (D-West Point). The village's representative on the Dane County Board is Tim Kiefer.

Economy
Waunakee added a local Village Center in 2006 that acts as a central nucleus for the community by offering a fitness center, senior center, meeting rooms, and a gymnasium. The Waunakee Business Park is a  business park development that hosts large and small business operations. Recent years have seen two redevelopments and two new apartment buildings on Main Street, a reconstruction and new streetscape on both Main Street and Century Avenue, a mural on the Waunakee Furniture building, and annual public art displays.

Top employers 
As of 2018 the top employers in the village are:

Transportation

Major highways

 Interstate 39/90/94 (concurrently) – has an exit for Waunakee at Wisconsin Highway 19, east of the city
 US Highway 12 – runs 4 miles west of Waunakee, with a connection via WIS-19
Wisconsin Highway 19 – heads west to Springfield Corners, U.S. 12, and Mazomanie; east to I-39/90/94 and Sun Prairie
Wisconsin Highway 113 – heads north to Dane, Lodi, Merrimac Ferry, and Baraboo; south to Madison

Airport

A number of homes are located along the runway, and many have hangars, allowing the airport to function as an airpark.

Commercial air service is provided by Dane County Regional Airport.

Railroad

A Wisconsin and Southern railroad line runs through town en route to Dane, Lodi, Baraboo, and Reedsburg.

Waunakee Railroad Depot previously served passengers until 1963.

Education
Waunakee is served by the Waunakee Community School District, whose schools include:
 Arboretum Elementary School (serves eastern/southeastern part of school district)
 Heritage Elementary School (serves southern and central part of school district)
 Prairie Elementary School (serves northern and western part of school district)
 Waunakee Intermediate School
 Waunakee Community Middle School
 Waunakee Community High School

The three public elementary schools serve students from kindergarten through 4th grade, the intermediate school 5th and 6th grades, the middle school 7th and 8th grades, and the high school grades 9 through 12.

Private schools include St. John the Baptist Catholic School and Madison Country Day School.

Warrior Stadium is the home of the high school lacrosse, football and track teams. It consists of a synthetic turf field.

Notable people

 Martha Bablitch, Judge of the Wisconsin Court of Appeals; lived in Waunakee
 John Bennett, 1956 Summer Olympics long jump silver medalist; lived in Waunakee
 Ernest J. Briskey, Vice President, Technical and Administration of Campbell Soup Company; Dean of Agricultural Science of Oregon State University; lived in Waunakee
 Ron Dayne, Heisman Trophy winner (1999), College Football Hall of Famer, NFL player; lived in Waunakee
 Bernice Fitz-Gibbon, advertising executive; born outside of Waunakee
 Edward E. Fitzgibbon, Wisconsin State Representative; born and lived outside of Waunakee
 Pat Ford, ice hockey player; lives in Waunakee
 Lawrence Johnson, NFL cornerback; lives in Waunakee
 Kenneth A. Koon, Army National Guard general; native of Waunakee
 Mike Moh, martial artist/actor; lives in Waunakee
 David D. O'Malley, Wisconsin State Representative; lived in Waunakee
 Cy Pieh, Major League Baseball player; born in Waunakee
 Robert Campbell Reeve, founder of Reeve Aleutian Airways; born in Waunakee
 Jack Salzwedel, chairman and CEO of American Family Insurance; lives in Waunakee
 Kelly Sheffield, Wisconsin Badgers women's volleyball coach; lives in Waunakee
 Georgia Thompson, civil servant; lived in Waunakee
 J.B. Van Hollen, former Attorney General of Wisconsin; lives in Waunakee

References

External links
 Village of Waunakee
 Waunakee Tribune newspaper
 Sanborn fire insurance map: 1894

Madison, Wisconsin, metropolitan statistical area
Villages in Dane County, Wisconsin
Villages in Wisconsin